Skowierzyn  is a village in the administrative district of Gmina Zaleszany, within Stalowa Wola County, Subcarpathian Voivodeship, in south-eastern Poland.

Unia Skowierzyn
Ludowy Zespół Sportowy Unia Skowierzyn is a Polish football club, which competes in the A-class, the seventh-tier of professional football. The club was founded in 1956, and has a yellow-black-green color.

References

Skowierzyn